William Boyle may refer to:

William Boyle (Irish writer) (1853–1923), Irish dramatist and short-story writer
William Boyle (piper) (died c. 1888), Irish piper
William Boyle, 12th Earl of Cork (1873–1967), Royal Navy officer 
William M. Boyle (1903–1961), American Democratic political activist from Kansas
William George Boyle (1830–1908), British soldier and politician
William James Boyle (1887–1971), political figure in Saskatchewan
William Michael Boyle (born 1978), American author
W. A. Boyle (1904–1985), president of the United Mine Workers of America union, 1963–1972
William Lewis Boyle (1859–1918), British Member of Parliament for Mid Norfolk, 1910–1918
Will Boyle (born 1995), English footballer for Cheltenham Town

See also
Billy Boyle, actor on British children's television